This was the tournament's first edition.

Maria Sharapova won the title, defeating Marta Domachowska in straight sets in the final. This was Sharapova's third WTA Tour title of the year and fifth of her career.

Seeds

Draw

Finals

Section 1

Section 2

External links
Draw on ITF website
Draw on WTA website

Korea Open (tennis)
Hansol Korea Open